This is a list of seasons completed by the Mercer Bears football team. The Bears compete in the Southern Conference of the NCAA Division I Football Championship Subdivision (FCS). Mercer fielded their first football team in 1892, and competed intermittently until 1941. The program was revived in 2013, and Mercer spent their first season competing in the Pioneer Football League before transitioning to the SoCon in 2014. The Bears are currently led by head coach Drew Cronic.

Seasons

See also

 Mercer Bears

References 

Mercer Bears
 
Mercer Bears football seasons